Ulrike Gräßler (born 17 May 1987) is a German ski jumper who has competed since 2003. She won a silver medal in the inaugural women's ski jumping event at the FIS Nordic World Ski Championships 2009 in Liberec.

Grässler has a total of eight Continental Cup victories in her career.

References 

 FIS profile

1987 births
Living people
People from Eilenburg
People from Bezirk Leipzig
German female ski jumpers
Sportspeople from Saxony
Olympic ski jumpers of Germany
Ski jumpers at the 2014 Winter Olympics
FIS Nordic World Ski Championships medalists in ski jumping
21st-century German women